The men's 100m backstroke events at the 2022 World Para Swimming Championships were held at the Penteada Olympic Swimming Complex in Madeira between 12 and 18 June.

Medalists

Results

S1

S2

S6
Final
Five swimmers from five nations took part.

S7
Final
Seven swimmers from six nations took part.

S8
Heats
11 swimmers from nine nations took part. The swimmers with the top eight times, regardless of heat, advanced to the final.

Final
The final was held on 132 June 2022.

S9

S10

S11

S12
Final
Five swimmers from five nations took part.

S13
Final
Eight swimmers from seven nations took part.

S14

References

2022 World Para Swimming Championships